Pandi Raidhi (14 April 1921 – 18 July 1999) was an Albanian film and theatre actor, and recipient of the People's Artist of Albania recognition.

Biography 
Raidhi was born on 14 April 1921 in Korçë in southern Albania. He started his artistic career in July 11 1920 in the variety show Dasma Korçare (Wedding of Korçë), where he conquested the public immediately.

Raidhi participated in the National Liberation Movement as part of the Anti-Fascist Youth organization, and afterwards, in 1948 after finishing high school he entered the National Theatre of Albania. In 1950 he returned to the Andon Zako Çajupi Theatre of Korçë where he would subsequently spend 40 years of acting.

He debuted in cinematography in the movie Tana of 1958. Furthermore, he would interpret in another 36 roles. Overall Raidhi has interpreted in around 200 roles in drama, comedies, operettas and movies.

Raidhi died in Berat on 11 July 1999.

Honors 
In 1975 Raidhi was given the highest award to be bestowed to artists, the People's Artist of Albania award. A street of Tirana bears his name.

Filmography 
Raidhi has participated in the following movies:

 Njerëz në rrymë – (1989)
 Familja ime – (1987) ...Tasi
 Përsëri pranverë – (1987) ...Uncle Tasi
 Rrethimi i vogël – (1986) ...Comrade Meti
 Duaje emrin tënd – (1984) ...Thoma
 Kush vdes në këmbë – (1984) ...Village's priest
 Nëntori i dytë – (1982) ...Demir Arbana
 Shoqja nga fshati – (1980)...Uncle Bako Këmbora
 Partizani i vogël Velo – (1980) ...Bani of Duke
 Agimet e stinës së madhe (1981) ...Sharko Sheqi
 Liri a vdekje – (1979) ...Çarçani
 Ne vinim nga lufta – (1979)
 Flamur në dallgë – (1977) (TV)
 Përballimi – (1976)...Pllaton Burbuqi
 Monumenti – (1976)...Llambro Leka
 Tokë e përgjakur – (1976)
 Zonja nga qyteti – (1976)...Uncle Bako Këmbora
 Beni ecën vetë – (1975)... Uncle Thoma
 Rrugicat që kërkonin diell – (1975) ...Jorgo, Cafeteria's owner
 Shpërthimi – (1974)...Lajmja
 Shtigje të luftës – (1974) ...Shaban's father
 Krevati i perandorit – (1973) ...Meke the partisan
 Yjet e netëve të gjata – (1972) ...Ago Beqo
 Kur zbardhi një ditë – (1971) ...Uncle Loni
 Mëngjeze lufte – (1971) ...Raqi Teneqenxhiu
 I teti ne bronz – (1970) ...The miller
 Horizonte të hapura – (1968) ...Uncle Ymer
 Ngadhënjim mbi vdekjen – (1967) ...Uncle Telo
 Vitet e para – (1965) ...Kasëm
 Tana – (1958)

References

Further reading 
 Kushtuar artistit të popullit, Pandi Raidhi : monografi, Author: Spiro Dhimitri Publisher: Korçë : Teatri Profesionist "Andon Z. Çajupi", 2003, OCLC: 62092961

1921 births
1999 deaths
Albanian male actors
People from Korçë
20th-century Albanian male actors
Albanian anti-fascists